The splenic lymph nodes are found at the splenic hilum and in relation to the tail of the pancreas (pancreaticolienal lymph nodes).

Their afferents are derived from the stomach, spleen, and pancreas. The splenic lymph nodes empty into the suprapancreatic, infrapancreatic and omental lymph nodes, which then drain to the coeliac nodes and cisterna chyli.

Additional images

References 

Lymphatics of the torso